= Clasp to the Iron Cross =

German World War II military decoration

Clasp to the Iron Cross Spange zum Eisernen Kreuz
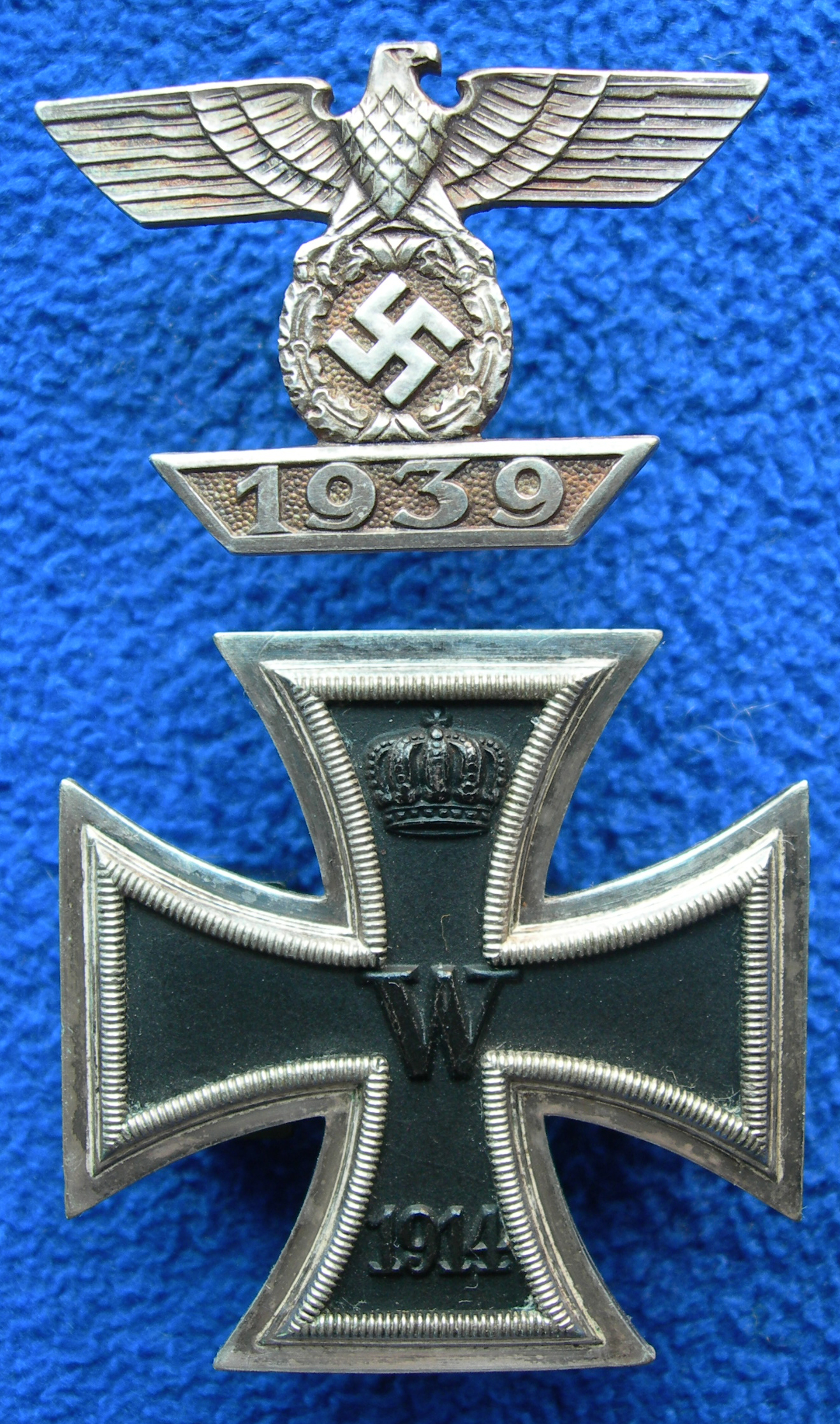
- 1939 Clasp to the Iron Cross 1st Class
- Type: Clasp
- Presented by: Nazi Germany
- Eligibility: Military personnel who had already received the Iron Cross (1914).
- Campaign: World War II
- Status: Obsolete
- Established: 1 September 1939

The Clasp to the Iron Cross (Spange zum Eisernen Kreuz) was a white metal medal clasp displayed on the uniforms of German Wehrmacht personnel who had been awarded the Iron Cross in World War I, and who again qualified for the decoration in World War II.

During the war, over 100,000 clasps were awarded.

== Description ==
A holder of the 1914 Iron Cross could qualify for the same grade of the 1939 Iron Cross. To permit the two awards to be worn together, a "1939 Clasp" (Spange) was established to be worn with the original 1914 Iron Cross. It depicted a national eagle clutching an oak leaf wreath surrounding a swastika above a trapezoid bearing the year 1939.

For the Second Class, the clasp was attached to the ribbon of the 1914 Iron Cross, either on a ribbon bar, or when the ribbon was worn through a tunic button hole. For the First Class, a larger differently proportioned clasp was pinned directly on the upper breast pocket above the Iron Cross 1st class (1914) of the wearer. This pin-back clasp was usually awarded in a presentation case.

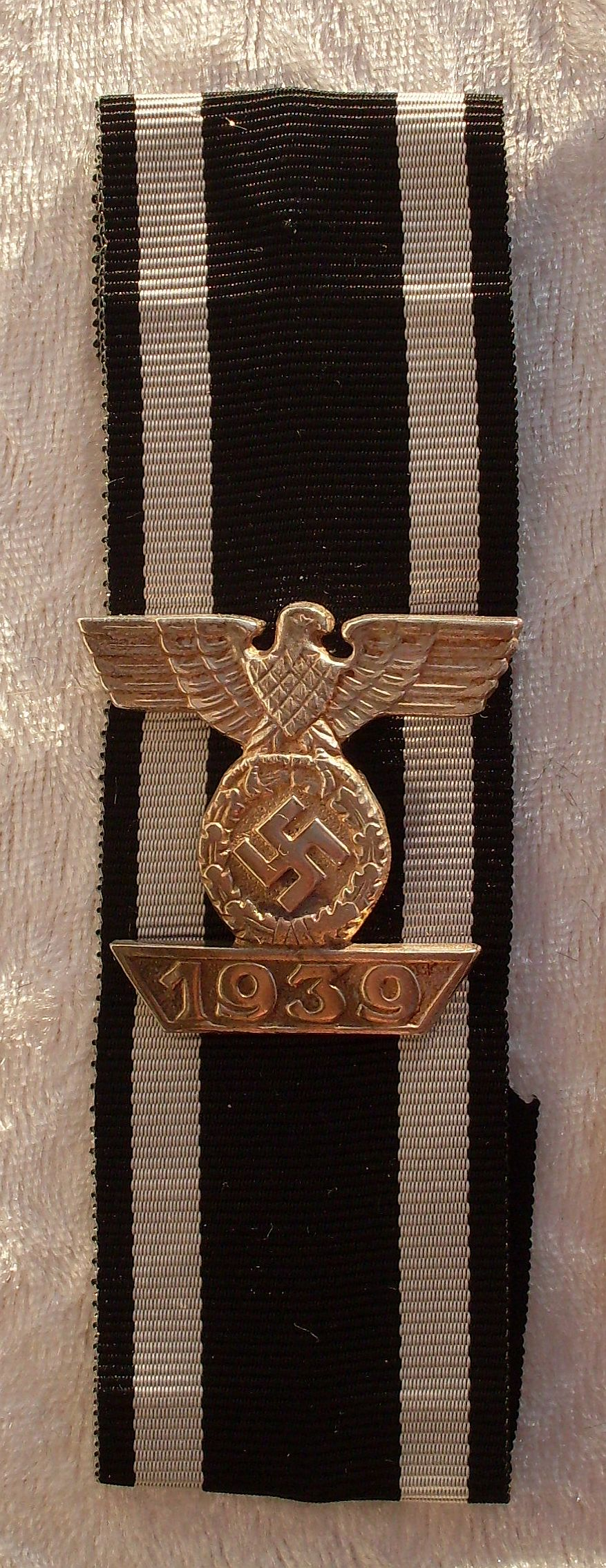
1939 Clasp to the Iron Cross 2nd Class mounted on the 1914 ribbon

While Nazi era awards were initially banned by the Federal Republic of Germany, in 1957 many World War II military decorations, including the Iron Cross, were re-authorised for wear by qualifying veterans. With display of the swastika banned, the clasp to the Iron Cross was re-designed as a silver rectangular bar bearing the date '1939', with a miniature Iron Cross in the centre of the bar.

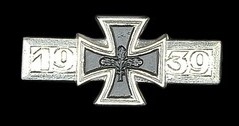
1957 redesigned Clasp to the Iron Cross
